North Central High School is a public high school located in Kershaw, South Carolina. It is governed by the Kershaw County School District. It serves students in the North Central area of Kershaw County and has a student population of approximately 500. The principal of NCHS is David Branham. It is home of the North Central Knights.

North Central is the result of a 1979 merger of Mt. Pisgah, Baron DeKalb, and Midway High Schools.  NCHS is one of the largest attendance zones (300 square miles) in the state serving the Cassatt, Mt. Pisgah, Bethune, Westville, Kershaw and Liberty Hill communities.  In 1999, the school board voted to close the Bethune High School.  Those students and staff members were consolidated into North Central's population.  Since its opening in 1979, North Central High has housed students in grades 9 through 12.  In 2002, the school district opened the new North Central Middle School, which moved grades 7 and 8 from the High School and grade 6 from the four elementary schools.  In 2008 NCHS saw the completion of the facilities equalization plan which included the addition of a new gym, wellness center, tennis courts, track, field house, athletic training facilities, and 450-seat auditorium.

At 10:33 p.m. on Saturday, January 11, 2020, an EF2 tornado with maximum wind speeds of 130 mph heavily damaged the campus, including the stadium, school, and approximately 28 school buses in the transportation office.  After the National Weather Service verified the tornado, they reported:

The school has been relocated to 874 Vocational Lane in Camden, South Carolina while repairs are made to the home campus.  The school reopened to students on January 15, 2020.

Notable alumni
 Tyronne Drakeford - Professional football player - San Francisco 49ers, New Orleans Saints, and Washington Redskins

References

Educational institutions with year of establishment missing
Public high schools in South Carolina
Schools in Kershaw County, South Carolina